Vincent de Paul (1581–1660) was a French Catholic priest who dedicated himself to serving the poor.

Vincent de Paul may also refer to:
 Vincent De Paul (actor)

See also
DePaul University
Saint-Vincent-de-Paul (disambiguation)
St. Vincent de Paul Church (disambiguation)
St. Vincent de Paul School (disambiguation)
Society of Saint Vincent de Paul
The Saint Vincent de Paul Food Pantry Stomp